John Agmondesham may refer to:

John Agmondesham (died 1573), MP for Reigate in 1571
John Agmondesham (died 1598), MP for Lostwithiel (UK Parliament constituency), Christchurch and Bossiney